Jarvis Eric Williams, Sr. (May 16, 1965 – May 25, 2010) was an American college and professional football player who was a defensive back in the National Football League (NFL) for seven seasons during the 1980s and 1990s.  Williams played college football for the University of Florida, and was recognized as an All-American.  Thereafter, he played professionally for the Miami Dolphins and the New York Giants of the NFL.  Williams died unexpectedly at the age of 45.

Early years 

Williams was born in Palatka, Florida in 1965.  He attended Palatka High School, and was a key player for the Palatka Panthers high school football team that won the Florida Class 3A state championship in 1981.

College career 

Williams accepted an athletic scholarship to attend the University of Florida in nearby Gainesville, Florida, where he played cornerback for head coach Galen Hall's Florida Gators football teams from 1984 to 1987.  As a freshman and sophomore, he was part of two of the best teams in Gators history; the team posted identical 9–1–1 overall win–loss records in 1984 and 1985, and the best-in-the-SEC records of 5–0–1 and 5–1 during those same seasons. Williams is often remembered for the hard-hitting tackle that he delivered to Miami Hurricanes wide receiver Melvin Bratton in 1986—a hit that left Bratton temporarily unconscious. He was named a first-team All-Southeastern Conference (SEC) selection in 1986 and a first-team All-American in 1987. Williams started forty-five consecutive games over four seasons (the second-highest total in Gators history), had ten career interceptions, and led the team in tackles (77) and punt returns (20 for 222 yards) during his senior season.

He was inducted into the University of Florida Athletic Hall of Fame as a "Gator Great" in 2001.

Professional career 

During the season, he recorded sixty tackles and two interceptions in thirteen games.

During his seven-season NFL career, Williams played in 104 regular season games and started in ninety-five of them; he recorded 575 tackles and sixteen interceptions, with one touchdown return.

Life after the NFL 

Williams worked as a volunteer assistant football coach at Interlachen High School in Interlachen, Florida, and as an assistant coach at Trinity Catholic High School in Ocala, Florida.

Williams' son, Jarvis Eric Williams, Jr., was the starting fullback from 2009 to 2010 for the Jacksonville University Dolphins football team, and was named the 2007 Pioneer Football League Newcomer of the Year by Street & Smith's College Football annual as the starting Linebacker for the Dolphins in his freshman season.  Williams' former Gators teammate, quarterback Kerwin Bell, was the coach of JU at the time.

Williams died suddenly and without prior warning from an acute asthma attack just before midnight on May 25, 2010; he was 45 years old.

See also 

 1987 College Football All-America Team
 List of Florida Gators football All-Americans
 List of Florida Gators in the NFL Draft
 List of University of Florida Athletic Hall of Fame members
 List of Miami Dolphins players
 List of New York Giants players

References

Bibliography 

 Carlson, Norm, University of Florida Football Vault: The History of the Florida Gators, Whitman Publishing, LLC, Atlanta, Georgia (2007).  .
 Golenbock, Peter, Go Gators!  An Oral History of Florida's Pursuit of Gridiron Glory, Legends Publishing, LLC, St. Petersburg, Florida (2002).  .
 Hairston, Jack, Tales from the Gator Swamp: A Collection of the Greatest Gator Stories Ever Told, Sports Publishing, LLC, Champaign, Illinois (2002).  .
 McCarthy, Kevin M.,  Fightin' Gators: A History of University of Florida Football, Arcadia Publishing, Mount Pleasant, South Carolina (2000).  .
 Nash, Noel, ed., The Gainesville Sun Presents The Greatest Moments in Florida Gators Football, Sports Publishing, Inc., Champaign, Illinois (1998).  .

1965 births
2010 deaths
African-American coaches of American football
African-American players of American football
All-American college football players
American football safeties
Deaths from asthma
Florida Gators football players
High school football coaches in Florida
Miami Dolphins players
New York Giants players
People from Palatka, Florida
20th-century African-American sportspeople
21st-century African-American people